Farisita is an unincorporated community in Huerfano County, Colorado, United States.

History

Fort Talpa

Fort Talpa, a Spanish adobe post, was built in the 1820s as a means of protection from possible attacks by Native Americans. In the 1870s, the fort was included as part of the town of Huerfano Cañon. In 1941, it was still standing next to the newer town of Farisita's general store. A post office called Farisita was established in 1923, and remained in operation until 1990. An early postmaster named the town for his daughter, Jeanette "Farisita" Faris, the nickname being Spanish for little Faris girl. Jeanette would later go on to run the post office and store herself. The Faris family cemetery is located at the town site, and has been in constant use since its creation, with Faris family members buried there as recently as 2010. The town had a morada, or meeting house, for the religious group Los Hermanos Penitentes. It was located across the river and among the trees.

Montoya Ranch

The Montoya Ranch is located at Farisita and features the only adobe building in Colorado or New Mexico with a full adobe basement. It was originally built in 1869 by the Montoya family and was later occupied by the Lebanese Faris family who used the building as a store and post office.

See also

References

External links

Populated places in Huerfano County, Colorado
Unincorporated communities in Huerfano County, Colorado